Serica was one of the easternmost countries of Asia known to the Ancient Greek and Roman geographers. It is generally taken as referring to North China during its Zhou, Qin, and Han dynasties, as it was reached via the overland Silk Road in contrast to the Sinae, who were reached via the maritime routes. A similar distinction was later observed during the Middle Ages between "Cathay" (north) and "Mangi" or "China" (south). The people of Serica were the Seres, whose name was also used for their region. Access to Serica was eased following the Han conquest of the Tarim Basin (modern Xinjiang) but largely blocked when the Parthian Empire fell to the Sassanids. Henry Yule summarized the classical geographers:
If we fuse into one the ancient notices of the Seres and their country, omitting anomalous statements and manifest fables, the result will be something like the "The region of the Seres is a vast and populous country, touching on the east the Ocean and the limits of the habitable world, and extending west to Imaus and the confines of Bactria. The people are civilized, mild, just, and frugal, eschewing collisions with their neighbours, and even shy of close intercourse, but not averse to dispose of their own products, of which raw silk is the staple, but which include also silk-stuffs, fine furs, and iron of remarkable quality." That is manifestly a definition of the Chinese.

Some scholars, however, contend the Seres were not the Chinese themselves but tribes speaking Indo-European languages on the western edges of the Chinese dynasties and empires who traded with the ancient Indians, such as the Yuezhi, Saka, and Tocharians.

Name
The Latin forms  and  derive from the Greek Sērikḗ and Sḗres. The Greeks and Romans knew of silk long before they understood its origin from silkworms, making sēr a backformation. Other forms of the name include Serica Regio. Flavius Josephus, in his book Antiquities of the Jews, book 1, paragraph 147, call that region "Σηρια", that in Latin letters is "Seria".

Some classicists have argued that it was extremely improbable that a nation would be named after an insect. Lassen claimed to have identified references to the Seres in Hindu scripture, as the "Çaka [Sakas], Tukhâra [Bactria], and Kanka [Kangju]".

Accounts

Overview

Beginning in the 1st century BC with Virgil, Horace, and Strabo, Roman histories offer only vague accounts of China and the silk-producing Seres of the Far East. Florus seems to have confused the Seres with peoples of India, or at least noted that their skin complexions proved that they both lived "beneath another sky" than the Romans. The 1st-century geographer Pomponius Mela asserted that the lands of the Seres formed the center of the coast of an eastern ocean, flanked to the south by India and to the north by the Scythians of the Eurasian Steppe. The historian Ammianus Marcellinus (c. 330 – c. 400) wrote that the land of the Seres was enclosed by great natural walls around a river called Bautis, possibly a description of the Yellow River. From Turkic peoples of Central Asia the later Eastern Romans (i.e. Byzantines) derived a new name for China, Taugast (Turkic: Tabghach), during its Northern Wei (386–535) period. By the time of the Eastern Roman ruler Justinian I (r. 527–565), the Byzantines purchased Chinese silk from Sogdian intermediaries. However, they also smuggled silkworms out of China with the help of Nestorian monks, who claimed that the land of "Serindia" was located north of India and produced the finest silk.

Ctesias
The first surviving European accounts of the Seres are those in Ctesias's 5th-century BC Indica, where he calls them "a people of portentous stature and longevity". The authenticity of the account is, however, disputed.

Strabo
Strabo's 1st-century Geography mentions the Seres in two asides. In the first passage, he mentions that "some writers" claim the Seres to be longer lived than the Indians of Musicanus, whom Onesicritus claimed lived to the age of 130. In the second, a passage discussing the Greco-Bactrian Kingdom, he mentions that Apollodorus of Artemita claimed the Bactrians' borders stretched "even as far as the Seres and the Phryni".

Pomponius Mela
Pomponius Mela's De situ orbis names the Seres as one of three peoples inhabiting the eastern extremity of Asia. He places the Seres between the Indians to the south and the Scythians to the north. In a later passage, he notes:
From these the course [of the Caspian shore] makes a bend and trends to the coast line which faces the east. That part which adjoins the Scythian promontory is first all impassable from snow; then an uncultivated tract occupied by savages. These tribes are the Cannibal Scythians and the Sakas, severed from one another by a region where none can dwell because of the number of wild animals. Another vast wilderness follows, occupied also by wild beasts, reaching to a mountain called Thabis which overhangs the sea. A long way from that the ridge of Taurus rises. The Seres come between the two; a race eminent for integrity and well known for the trade which they allow to be transacted behind their backs, leaving their wares in a desert spot.

Pliny

Pliny the Elder discussed the Seres in his Natural History, Book VI, chapter xx. He similarly placed the Seres beyond a wasteland on the other side of Scythia; like Vergil before him, he patently misunderstands sericulture, believing the silk to be a product of certain trees:
Then [sc. east of the Caspian], we again find tribes of Scythians and again desert tracts occupied only by wild animals, till we come to that mountain chain overhanging the sea which is called Tabis. Not till nearly half the length of the coast which looks north-east has been past do you find inhabited country. The first race then encountered are the Seres, so famous for the fleecy product of their forests ... The Seres are famous for the woolen substance obtained from their forests; after a soaking in water they comb off the white down of the leaves ... So manifold is the labour employed, and so distant is the region of the globe drawn upon, to enable the Roman maiden to flaunt transparent clothing in public ...

Ammianus also reports this version, although Pausanias knew that silk came from insects specially cultivated by the Seres for the purpose, suggesting closer attention to Roman diplomats and traders who had visited China.

Elsewhere, Pliny mentions that their iron—which they "send to us with their tissues and skins"—is the highest quality in the world, surpassing even Parthian iron.

Pliny also reports a curious description of the Seres made by an embassy from Taprobane to Emperor Claudius, suggesting they may be referring to the Indo-European populations of the Tarim Basin, such as the Tocharians:

They also informed us that the side of their island which lies opposite to India is ten thousand stadia in length, and runs in a south-easterly direction—that beyond the Emodian Mountains (Himalayas) they look towards the Serve (Seres), whose acquaintance they had also made in the pursuits of commerce; that the father of Rachias (the ambassador) had frequently visited their country, and that the Serae always came to meet them on their arrival. These people, they said, exceeded the ordinary human height, had flaxen hair, and blue eyes, and made an uncouth sort of noise by way of talking, having no language of their own for the purpose of communicating their thoughts. The rest of their information (on the Serae) was of a similar nature to that communicated by our merchants. It was to the effect that the merchandize on sale was left by them upon the opposite bank of a river on their coast, and it was then removed by the natives, if they thought proper to deal on terms of exchange. On no grounds ought luxury with greater reason to be detested by us, than if we only transport our thoughts to these scenes, and then reflect, what are its demands, to what distant spots it sends in order to satisfy them, and for how mean and how unworthy an end!

Ptolemy

The country of "Serica" is positioned in the 150 AD Ptolemy world map in the area beyond the "Imaus" (Pamir Mountains). This shows that he considered Serica to either incorporate or consist of what is now Xinjiang.

Ptolemy also positions the Sinae quite precisely:

Ptolemy also speaks of "Sera, the Capital of the Seres". Henry Yule argued that Ptolemy's misrendering of the Indian Sea as a closed basin meant that Ptolemy must also have misplaced the Chinese coast, and therefore the idea that Sinae is a separate country from Serica would be a misconception.

In his Geography, Ptolemy wrote of lands in and around the Indian Ocean. He explained that a port city called Kattigara lay beyond the Golden Chersonese (i.e. the Malay Peninsula) and was visited by a Greek sailor named Alexander, most likely a merchant. In an 1877 publication Ferdinand von Richthofen offered the idea that Kattigara was located near modern Hanoi, within the ancient Chinese province of Jiaozhi that existed in northern Vietnam. However, archaeological finds of Roman and Mediterranean artefacts at Óc Eo (near Ho Chi Minh City) in the Mekong Delta of southern Vietnam hint that this was the location of the port city related by Ptolemy. Roman golden medallions dating to the reign of Antoninus Pius and Marcus Aurelius were uncovered there, seeming to suggest Roman commercial activity in Southeast Asia during at least the Antonine period (supported by other finds in Thailand, Indonesia, and Malaysia). Chinese histories affirmed that merchants of "Daqin" (i.e. the Roman Empire) were active in Cambodia and Vietnam. The archaeological evidence seems to correspond with the Chinese claim that a Roman embassy sent by a ruler named "Andun" (安敦; either Antoninus Pius or Marcus Aurelius) in 166 AD first arrived in Jiaozhi, the same region as other Chinese-recorded Roman embassies to follow.

Geography and economy

As Ptolemy describes it, Serica was bordered in the north by the Annibi and Auxacii Montes, identified as the Altai Mountains. The Montes Asmiraei, a Serican district, are the Da-Uri Chain while the Cassi Montes are believed to be the mountains of the Gobi Desert. Ptolemy names the principal river of the Seres as the Bautisus, identified as the Yellow River.

The Greco-Roman writers name over a dozen tribes and fifteen cities of the Seres. It is evident from their portrayals that they are not all of the same ethnicity but share a common national appellation. Their capital is named as Sera. Possible candidates include Kashgar and Yarkand. Issedon, the capital of the Serican Issedones, is thought to have been situated on the eastern slopes of the Pamirs or even the Altai Mountains, while the third notable city, Aspacara, was described as located near the source of the Yellow River.

The ancient fathers also describe the pleasant climate of Serica and its plenitude in natural resources. Among these are iron, furs and skins, and precious stones.

See also

 Xiongnu
 Golden Chersonese, the Malay Peninsula described by Ptolemy
 Kattigara, the Vietnamese port of Chinese-controlled Jiaozhou (region) described by Ptolemy
 Sino-Roman relations &  History of the Han Dynasty
 Daqin, Rome as understood by the Chinese
 Zhang Qian, an explorer of the overland Silk Road from the Chinese end

Notes

References

Citations

Sources 
 .
 .
 Dictionary of Greek and Roman Geography, Sir William Smith (Editor), Spottiswoode and Co;, London, 1873
 Oxford Classical Dictionary, Simon Hornblower and Antony Spawforth (Editors), Oxford University Press, 2003

External links
 "Cathay and the way thither", on the Seres.
 Extracts from Ptolemy's Geographia
Extracts from Pliny's Natural History
Extracts from Pomponius Mela "De Situ Orbis"
 Pliny on the Seres
Pomponius Mela's De Situ Orbis (Latin)
 Serica - some notes on old Chinese books, blog by David Helliwell, Bodleian Library, Oxford

Historical regions
Foreign relations of ancient Rome
Ancient peoples of China
Indo-European peoples
Names of China
Tocharians